A Linkwitz–Riley (L-R) filter is an infinite impulse response filter used in Linkwitz–Riley audio crossovers, named after its inventors Siegfried Linkwitz and Russ Riley. This filter type was originally described in Active Crossover Networks for Noncoincident Drivers in the Journal of the Audio Engineering Society. It is also known as a Butterworth squared filter. A Linkwitz–Riley "L-R" crossover consists of a parallel combination of a low-pass and a high-pass L-R filter. The filters are usually designed by cascading two Butterworth filters, each of which has −3 dB gain at the cut-off frequency. The resulting Linkwitz–Riley filter has −6 dB gain at the cut-off frequency. This means that, upon summing the low-pass and high-pass outputs, the gain at the crossover frequency will be 0 dB, so the crossover behaves like an all-pass filter, having a flat amplitude response with a smoothly changing phase response. This is the biggest advantage of L-R crossovers compared to even-order Butterworth crossovers, whose summed output has a +3 dB peak around the crossover frequency. Since cascading two nth-order Butterworth filters will give a (2n)th-order Linkwitz–Riley filter, theoretically any (2n)th-order Linkwitz–Riley crossover can be designed. However, crossovers of order higher than 4 may have less usability due to their complexity and the increasing size of the peak in group delay around the crossover frequency.

Common types

Second-order Linkwitz–Riley crossover (LR2, LR-2)

Second-order Linkwitz–Riley crossovers (LR2) have a 12 dB/octave (40 dB/decade) slope. They can be realized by cascading two one-pole filters, or using a Sallen Key filter topology with a Q0 value of 0.5. There is a 180° phase difference between the low-pass and high-pass output of the filter, which can be corrected by inverting one signal. In loudspeakers this is usually done by reversing the polarity of one driver if the crossover is passive. For active crossovers inversion is usually done using a unity gain inverting op-amp.

Fourth-order Linkwitz–Riley crossover (LR4, LR-4)

Fourth-order Linkwitz–Riley crossovers (LR4) are probably today's most commonly used type of audio crossover. They are constructed by cascading two 2nd-order Butterworth filters. Their slope is 24 dB/octave (80 dB/decade).  The phase difference amounts to 360°, i.e. the two drives appear in phase, albeit with a full period time delay for the low-pass section.

Eighth-order Linkwitz–Riley crossover (LR8, LR-8)

Eighth-order Linkwitz–Riley crossovers (LR8) have a very steep, 48 dB/octave (160 dB/decade) slope. They can be constructed by cascading two 4th-order Butterworth filters.

See also

Audio crossover
Butterworth filter
Partition of unity
Siegfried Linkwitz

References

Linkwitz Lab: Crossovers
Linkwitz Lab: Active Filters
Linkwitz–Riley Crossovers: A Primer
Glossary: Linkwitz–Riley

Linear filters
Network synthesis filters
Audio engineering
Filter theory